Herrstein is a former Verbandsgemeinde ("collective municipality") in the district of Birkenfeld, in Rhineland-Palatinate, Germany. The seat of the Verbandsgemeinde was in Herrstein. On 1 January 2020 it was merged into the new Verbandsgemeinde Herrstein-Rhaunen.

The Verbandsgemeinde Herrstein consisted of the following Ortsgemeinden ("local municipalities"):

Former Verbandsgemeinden in Rhineland-Palatinate